The women's 100 metres event at the 1990 Commonwealth Games was held on 27 and 28 January at the Mount Smart Stadium in Auckland.

Medalists

Results

Heats
Qualification: First 5 of each heat (Q) and the next 3 fastest (q) qualified for the semifinals.

Wind:Heat 1: +3.3 m/s, Heat 2: -0.3 m/s, Heat 3: +0.8 m/s

Semifinals
Qualification: First 4 of each heat (Q) and the next 1 fastest (q) qualified for the final.

Wind:Heat 1: +1.6 m/s, Heat 2: +1.6 m/s

Final
Wind: +4.4 m/s

References

100
1990
1990 in women's athletics